Challis Sanderson (1899-1945) was a British film editor and director.

Selected filmography
Director
 The Law Divine (1920)
 Three Men in a Boat (1920)
 The Scallywag (1921)
 The Merchant of Venice (1922)
 Cock o' the North (1935)
 Stars on Parade (1936)

Editor
 Not for Sale (1924)
 The Conspirators (1924)
 We Women (1925)
 Romance in Rhythm (1934)
 Father O'Flynn (1935)
 Lieut. Daring R.N. (1935)
 Variety Parade (1936)
 Love Up the Pole (1936)
 Song of the Forge (1937)

References

External links
 

1899 births
1945 deaths
British film editors
Film directors from London